Six ships of the Royal Navy have borne the name HMS Hasty:

 was a 12-gun gunvessel launched in 1797 and sold in 1802.
 was a 12-gun gun-brig launched in 1812. She became a survey vessel in 1819, a mud-engine in 1827, and was still in service in 1870.
 was an  wooden screw gunboat launched in 1856 and sold in 1865.
 was a  launched in 1894 and sold in 1912.
  was an H-class destroyer launched in 1936 and sunk in 1942 after being torpedoed by an E-boat.

Royal Navy ship names